Johnny Marajo (born 12 October 1993 in  Martinique) is a professional footballer who plays as a forward for Club Franciscain in the Martinique Championnat National and internationally for Martinique.

He made his debut for Martinique in 2015. He was in the Martinique Gold Cup squad for the 2017 tournament.

References

1993 births
Living people
Martiniquais footballers
Martinique international footballers
Association football forwards
2017 CONCACAF Gold Cup players
2019 CONCACAF Gold Cup players
2021 CONCACAF Gold Cup players